Republic of Guinea-Bissau passports are issued to citizens of Guinea-Bissau to facilitate international travel. A passport is not required for Guinea-Bissau citizens to travel to member states of the Economic Community of West African States (ECOWAS).

Types
Guinea-Bissau passports come in three forms:

Ordinary passport
 Issued to all citizens of the Republic of Guinea-Bissau for international travel.

Official passport
 Issued to all individual citizens who work for the government and have to travel on official business.

Diplomatic passport
 Issued to diplomats and their family members when they serve overseas.

Passport cover

Guinea-Bissau passports are dark green in color, with the words "Republic of Guinea-Bissau" inscribed on top of the booklet. The Guinea-Bissau coat of arms is emblazoned in the center of the cover page, followed on the bottom by the inscription of the word "PASSAPORTE" on ordinary passports.

Passport information
The given below information is printed on the identification page in Portuguese and English.

  Type
  Passport No. 	
  Given name(s) 	
  Date of birth 	 
  Sex 
  Place of birth
  Place of Issue 	
  Date of expiry
  Surname
  Nationality
  Residence
  Date of issue

See also 
ECOWAS passports
List of passports
Guinea-Bissau
Foreign relations of Guinea-Bissau
Visa requirements for Guinea-Bissauan citizens

References

Passports by country
Passport
Law of Guinea-Bissau